HD 167257 (HR 6821) is a solitary star in the southern constellation Telescopium. It has an apparent magnitude of 6.05, making it faintly visible to the naked eye. This indicates that it is drifting towards the Solar System.

HD 167257 has a stellar classification of B9 V, indicating that it is an ordinary B-type main-sequence star. It has 2.63 times the mass of the Sun, and 2.8 times the radius of the Sun.

References

Telescopium (constellation)
089597
167257
6821
Durchmusterung objects
B-type main-sequence stars